The 1969 Individual Ice Speedway World Championship was the fourth edition of the World Championship.

The winner was Gabdrakhman Kadyrov of the Soviet Union for the third time.

Final 
 March 9
  Inzell

References

Ice speedway competitions
Ice